In the United States, the federal funds rate is the interest rate at which depository institutions (banks and credit unions) lend reserve balances to other depository institutions overnight on an uncollateralized basis. Reserve balances are amounts held at the Federal Reserve to maintain depository institutions' reserve requirements. Institutions with surplus balances in their accounts lend those balances to institutions in need of larger balances. The federal funds rate is an important benchmark in financial markets.

The effective federal funds rate (EFFR) is calculated as the effective median interest rate of overnight federal funds transactions during the previous business day. It is published daily by the Federal Reserve Bank of New York.

The federal funds target range is determined by a meeting of the members of the Federal Open Market Committee (FOMC) which normally occurs eight times a year about seven weeks apart. The committee may also hold additional meetings and implement target rate changes outside of its normal schedule.

The Federal Reserve uses open market operations to bring the effective rate into the target range. The target range is chosen in part to influence the money supply in the U.S. economy.

Mechanism
Financial institutions are obligated by law to hold liquid assets that can be used to cover sustained net cash outflows. Among these assets are the deposits that the institutions maintain, directly or indirectly, with a Federal Reserve Bank. An institution that is below its required liquidity can address this temporarily by borrowing from institutions that have Federal Reserve deposits in excess of the requirement. The interest rate that a borrowing bank pays to a lending bank to borrow the funds is negotiated between the two banks, and the weighted average of this rate across all such transactions is the effective federal funds rate.

The Federal Open Market Committee regularly sets a target range for the federal funds rate according to its policy goals and the economic conditions of the United States. It directs the Federal Reserve Banks to influence the rate toward that range with open market operations or adjustments to their own deposit interest rates. Although this is commonly referred to as "setting interest rates," the effect is not immediate and depends on the banks' response to money market conditions. Separately, the Federal Reserve lends directly to institutions through its discount window, at a rate that is usually higher than the federal funds rate.

Future contracts in the federal funds rate trade on the Chicago Board of Trade (CBOT), and the financial press refer to these contracts when estimating the probabilities of upcoming FOMC actions.

Applications
Interbank borrowing is essentially a way for banks to quickly raise money. For example, a bank may want to finance a major industrial effort but may not have the time to wait for deposits or interest (on loan payments) to come in. In such cases the bank will quickly raise this amount from other banks at an interest rate equal to or higher than the Federal funds rate.

Raising the federal funds rate will dissuade banks from taking out such inter-bank loans, which in turn will make cash that much harder to procure. Conversely, dropping the interest rates will encourage banks to borrow money and therefore invest more freely. This interest rate is used as a regulatory tool to control how freely the U.S. economy operates.

By setting a higher discount rate the Federal Bank discourages banks from requisitioning funds from the Federal Bank, yet positions itself as a lender of last resort.

Comparison with LIBOR
Though the London Interbank Offered Rate (LIBOR), the Secured Overnight Financing Rate (SOFR) and the federal funds rate are concerned with the same action, i.e. interbank loans, they are distinct from one another, as follows:
 The target federal funds rate is a target interest rate that is set by the FOMC for implementing U.S. monetary policies.
 The (effective) federal funds rate is achieved through open market operations at the Domestic Trading Desk at the Federal Reserve Bank of New York which deals primarily in domestic securities (U.S. Treasury and federal agencies' securities).
 LIBOR is based on a questionnaire where a selection of banks guess the rates at which they could borrow money from other banks.
 LIBOR may or may not be used to derive business terms. It is not fixed beforehand and is not meant to have macroeconomic ramifications.

Predictions by the market
Considering the wide impact a change in the federal funds rate can have on the value of the dollar and the amount of lending going to new economic activity, the Federal Reserve is closely watched by the market.  The prices of Option contracts on fed funds futures (traded on the Chicago Board of Trade) can be used to infer the market's expectations of future Fed policy changes.  Based on CME Group 30-Day Fed Fund futures prices, which have long been used to express the market's views on the likelihood of changes in U.S. monetary policy, the CME Group FedWatch tool allows market participants to view the probability of an upcoming Fed Rate hike. One set of such implied probabilities is published by the Cleveland Fed.

Historical rates

The last full cycle of rate increases occurred between June 2004 and June 2006 as rates steadily rose from 1.00% to 5.25%. The target rate remained at 5.25% for over a year, until the Federal Reserve began lowering rates in September 2007. The last cycle of easing monetary policy through the rate was conducted from September 2007 to December 2008 as the target rate fell from 5.25% to a range of 0.00–0.25%. Between December 2008 and December 2015 the target rate remained at 0.00–0.25%, the lowest rate in the Federal Reserve's history, as a reaction to the Financial crisis of 2007–2008 and its aftermath. According to Jack A. Ablin, chief investment officer at Harris Private Bank, one reason for this unprecedented move of having a range, rather than a specific rate, was because a rate of 0% could have had problematic implications for money market funds, whose fees could then outpace yields. In October 2019 the target range for the Federal Funds Rate was 1.50–1.75%.  On March 15, 2020 the target range for Federal Funds Rate was 0.00–0.25%, a full percentage point drop less than two weeks after being lowered to 1.00–1.25%.

In light of the 2021–2022 global inflation surge, the Federal Reserve has raised the FFR aggressively. In the latter half of 2022, the FOMC had hiked the FFR by 0.75 percentage points on 4 different consecutive occasions, and in its final meeting of 2022, hiked the FFR a further 0.5 percentage points. The FFR sits presently at about 4.4%, and the Fed has foreshadowed that the rate will not be lowered until 2024 at the earliest.

Explanation of federal funds rate decisions
When the FOMC wishes to reduce interest rates they will increase the supply of money by buying government securities. When additional supply is added and everything else remains constant, the price of borrowed funds – the federal funds rate – falls. Conversely, when the Committee wishes to increase the federal funds rate, they will instruct the Desk Manager to sell government securities, thereby taking the money they earn on the proceeds of those sales out of circulation and reducing the money supply. When supply is taken away and everything else remains constant, the interest rate will normally rise.

The Federal Reserve has responded to a potential slow-down by lowering the target federal funds rate during recessions and other periods of lower growth. In fact, the Committee's lowering has recently predated recessions, in order to stimulate the economy and cushion the fall.  Reducing the federal funds rate makes money cheaper, allowing an influx of credit into the economy through all types of loans.

The charts referenced below show the relation between S&P 500 and interest rates.

 July 13, 1990 – Sept 4, 1992: 8.00–3.00% (Includes 1990–1991 recession)
 Feb 1, 1995 – Nov 17, 1998: 6.00–4.75 
 May 16, 2000 – June 25, 2003: 6.50–1.00 (Includes 2001 recession)
 June 29, 2006 – Oct 29, 2008: 5.25–1.00

Bill Gross of PIMCO suggested that in the prior 15 years ending in 2007, in each instance where the fed funds rate was higher than the nominal GDP growth rate, assets such as stocks and housing fell.

Rates since 2008 global economic downturn

 Dec 16, 2008: 0.0–0.25
 Dec 16, 2015: 0.25–0.50
 Dec 14, 2016: 0.50–0.75
 Mar 15, 2017: 0.75–1.00
 Jun 14, 2017: 1.00–1.25
 Dec 13, 2017: 1.25–1.50
 Mar 21, 2018: 1.50–1.75
 Jun 13, 2018: 1.75–2.00
 Sep 26, 2018: 2.00–2.25
Dec 19, 2018: 2.25–2.50
 Jul 31, 2019: 2.00–2.25
 Sep 18, 2019: 1.75–2.00
 Oct 30, 2019: 1.50–1.75
 Mar 3, 2020: 1.00–1.25
 Mar 15, 2020: 0.00–0.25
 Mar 16, 2022: 0.25–0.50
 May 4, 2022: 0.75–1.00
 Jun 15, 2022: 1.50–1.75
 Jul 27, 2022: 2.25–2.50
 Sep 21, 2022: 3.00–3.25
 Nov 2, 2022: 3.75–4.00
 Dec 14, 2022: 4.25–4.50
 Feb 1, 2023: 4.50–4.75

International effects
A low federal funds rate makes investments in developing countries such as China or Mexico more attractive. A high federal funds rate makes investments outside the United States less attractive. The long period of a very low federal funds rate from 2009 forward resulted in an increase in investment in developing countries. As the United States began to return to a higher rate in the end of 2015 investments in the United States became more attractive and the rate of investment in developing countries began to fall. The rate also affects the value of currency, a higher rate increasing the value of the U.S. dollar and decreasing the value of currencies such as the Mexican peso.

See also
Austrian Business Cycle Theory
Bank Rate
Demand Management
Eonia
Equation of exchange
Euro Interbank Offered Rate
Federal Reserve Economic Data
Inverted yield curve
Modern Monetary Theory
Monetary policy
Mortgage industry of the United States
Official cash rate
Official bank rate
Real interest rate
SARON
SONIA
Taylor rule
Zero interest rate policy

References

External links
 Historical Data: Effective Federal Funds Rate (interactive graph) from the Federal Reserve Bank of St. Louis
 Federal Reserve Web Site: Federal Funds Rate Historical Data (including the current rate), Monetary Policy, and Open Market Operations
  MoneyCafe.com page with Fed Funds Rate and historical chart and graph 
 Historical data (since 1954) comparing the US GDP growth rate versus the US Fed Funds Rate - in the form of a chart/graph 
 Federal Reserve Bank of Cleveland: Fed Fund Rate Predictions
 Federal Funds Rate Data including Daily effective overnight rate and Target rate

Banking
Federal Reserve System
Interest rates